Hariyali Devi Temple is a Hindu temple devoted to Maa Hariyali Devi. It is located in Rudraprayag district of Uttarakhand. Hariyali Devi is also worshipped as Bala Devi and Vaishno Devi.

History
According to the Hindu mythology, when Mahamaya was conceived as the seventh issue of Devaki, Kansa threw Mahamaya violently on the ground. Mahamaya's body split into multiple parts and these were scattered all over the earth. It is believed that one among those parts, the hand, fell at Haryali Kantha.

Geography & Location

Hariyali devi is located at an altitude of 1371m. The temple contains a bejeweled idol of Maa Hariyali Devi astride a lion. The temple houses chiefly three idols namely, Ma Hariyali Devi, Kshatrapal and Heet Devi
How To Reach: A route diverting from Nagrasu, 18 km from Rudraprayag towards Gauchar at NH58, leads to the Siddha Peeth of Hariyali Devi 22 km away. It is approx. 38 km from main town of Rudraprayag.
Latitide 30°24'N and 79°03'E

When to Visit

Temple is open throughout the year but is more festive at the time of Dhanteras, Rakshabandhan, Navratras and Deepavalli. On these occasions, the devotees accompany the idol of Maa Hariyali Devi, covering a distance of 6–7 km to reach Hariyali Kantha.

References

Hindu temples in Uttarakhand
Rudraprayag district
Shakti temples